The 2011–12 Santa Clara Broncos men's basketball team represented Santa Clara University during the 2011–12 NCAA Division I men's basketball season. The Broncos, led by fifth-year head coach Kerry Keating, played their home games at the Leavey Center and are members of the West Coast Conference. They finished the season 8–22, 0–16 in WCC play to finish in ninth place and lost in the first round of the West Coast Conference tournament to Portland.

Roster

Schedule
 
|-
!colspan=9| Exhibition

|-
!colspan=9| Regular season

|-
!colspan=9| West Coast Conference tournament

References

Santa Clara
Santa Clara Broncos men's basketball seasons